Janice Koh (born December 10, 1973)  is a Singaporean actress and a former Nominated Member of Parliament in Singapore.

Education 
Koh had her secondary school education at Singapore Chinese Girls' School. She later graduated from the Theatre Studies and Drama programme at Victoria Junior College and the National University of Singapore with an Honours degree in Theatre Studies. She also has a master's degree in Theatre with Distinction from Goldsmiths College, London.

Career 
On television, Koh is well known for her role as the ambitious lawyer Angela Ang on the MediaCorp Channel 5 legal drama The Pupil. Her performance earned her an Asian Television Awards 2010 nomination for Best Performance by an Actress in a Leading Role. Other projects include Fighting Spiders and Chase for Channel 5 and the award-winning Singapore Short Story Project. More recently, she played the quirky mom of Amos Lee in Okto’s The Dairy of Amos Lee.
 
A familiar face in the theatre scene, Koh won the coveted Life! Theatre Award for Best Actress in 2003 for her performance as Catherine in David Auburn's Proof and received a Life! Theatre Award Best Actress nomination in 2008 for her role in Ovidia Yu’s acclaimed play Hitting (On) Women. Recent work include Pangdemonium’s Swimming with Sharks, Alfian Sa'at’s sold-out play Cooling Off Day by W!LD RICE, Tan Tarn How's critically acclaimed Fear of Writing,《我爱阿爱》 by The Theatre Practice, Poop by The Finger Players, which was also nominated for the Life! Theatre Best Ensemble Award, The Crab Flower Club by Toy Factory, 120 and Diaspora by TheatreWorks.
 
Internationally, Koh has toured with a number of productions to major venues and festivals in Europe and Asia, including The King Lear Project to the Kunsten Festival des Arts in Brussels and TheatreWorks' Diaspora at the Edinburgh International Festival.

Koh made her international acting debut in the rom-com Crazy Rich Asians, directed by Jon M. Chu, starring Constance Wu and Henry Golding, and based on the critically-acclaimed novel of the same title by Kevin Kwan. Filming was done on location in both Malaysia and Singapore, where much of the first of three books in the series is based. The film was released globally in 2018, by Warner Bros.

Politics 
In 2012, Koh was selected to be one of nine new Nominated Member of Parliament (NMPs) in Singapore. She was nominated by the Arts community and was chosen from 47 eligible candidates. Koh is known for her support of the Singaporean arts scene, and her desire for transparency in regards to the MDA's censorship rulings.

Filmography

Film

Television

Theatre

Awards
DBS Life! Theatre Award for Best Actress for her performance as Catherine in David Auburn's Proof in 2003.
 In 2008, Koh received a Life! Theatre Award Best Actress nomination for her role in Ovidia Yu’s acclaimed play Hitting (On) Women.
 Koh's performance in The Pupil (TV series) earned her an Asian Television Awards 2010 nomination for Best Performance by an Actress in a Leading Role.
2021, Best Actress in a Supporting Role, 26th Asian Television Awards, Teenage Textbook: The Series (Nominated)
2022,  Chevalier of the National Ordre des Arts et des Lettres (France)

See also

TheatreWorks

References

External links 

Janice Koh
 Veterans now rookies

Living people
Singaporean people of Chinese descent
Singaporean television personalities
Singaporean television actresses
Singaporean actresses
Singaporean stage actresses
Victoria Junior College alumni
National University of Singapore alumni
Singaporean Nominated Members of Parliament
21st-century Singaporean actresses
Singaporean women in politics
1973 births
Chevaliers of the Ordre des Arts et des Lettres